The Phongolo River is a river in South Africa. It is a tributary of the Maputo River. It rises near Utrecht in northern KwaZulu-Natal, flows east through Pongolo, is dammed at Pongolapoort, and crosses the Ubombo Mountains; then it flows north towards Mozambique, joining the Maputo River.

Its main tributaries are the Bivane River and the Mozana River in South Africa, as well as the Ngwavuma in Eswatini.

See also
 1305 Pongola
 Pongolapoort Dam
 List of rivers of South Africa

References 

Maputo River
Rivers of KwaZulu-Natal